The Government Gazette was the government gazette for the British colony of Lagos. It was published between 1887 and April 1906.

It was continued by the Government Gazette of the Protectorate of Southern Nigeria after Lagos was incorporated into the already existing Southern Nigeria Protectorate in February 1906.

See also
List of British colonial gazettes

References

External links
Nigeria official publications at the British Library

Publications established in 1887
Publications disestablished in 1906
Colonial Nigeria
History of Nigeria
Government gazettes of Nigeria
History of Lagos
19th century in Lagos
20th century in Lagos